Mycena illuminans is a species of agaric fungus in the family Mycenaceae. It is bioluminescent.

See also
List of bioluminescent fungi

References

External links

illuminans
Bioluminescent fungi
Fungi described in 1903
Fungi of Asia
Taxa named by Paul Christoph Hennings